Cyclohexylthiophthalimide (abbreviated CTP) is an organosulfur compound that is used in production of rubber.  It is a white solid, although commercial samples often appear yellow.  It features the sulfenamide functional group, being a derivative of phthalimide and cyclohexanethiol.  In the production of synthetic rubber, CTP impedes the onset of sulfur vulcanization.

References 

Reagents for organic chemistry
Phthalimides
Sulfenamides